Equatorial Spanish, also called Coastal Colombian-Ecuadorian dialect or Chocoano, is a dialect of Spanish spoken mainly in the coastal region of Ecuador, as well as in the bordering coastal areas of northern Peru and southern Colombia. 

It is considered to be transitional between the Caribbean dialects and the Peruvian Coast varieties. Thus, the dialect sets the phonemical axis of accentual-tonal transition throughout the American varieties of Spanish, which extends geographically from the northern semi-low intonation of Central American and the Caribbean dialects (since only the European variants of Spanish are particularly low-pitched) to the sharp high intonation characteristic of the lands located south, typical of Peru, Chile, and Argentina.

Therefore, the variant of Spanish spoken in the Ecuadorian coast and its neighboring western Andean plains, shares many features of both Caribbean dialects of northern Colombia and Venezuela, as well as some southern features of the Peruvian seaboard, making identification of this dialect very difficult to the ears of an outsider.

The major influential linguistic centers are Guayaquil and Buenaventura. There is an important subvariety of this dialect which is spoken by most of the communities of West African descent dwelling on the border between coastal Colombia (Chocó department), Ecuador (Esmeraldas province), and Peru (Tumbes Region), and which is said to reflect African influence in terms of intonation and rhythm.

The particular intonation which identifies the speakers of these regions has been a subject of study. Boyd-Bowman (1953) states that the features that he has observed show clearly a phonetic continuity along the coasts of Venezuela, Colombia, Ecuador, and Peru, in contrast to that of their respective Andean provinces.
Boyd-Bowman observes that the present borders of Ecuador with the neighboring countries do not correspond to natural geographic boundaries, nor to linguistic/cultural boundaries (the same Spanish is spoken on both sides), nor to older political borders, whether of the Incas or of the Spanish colonies.

Notable phonological characteristics

Equatorial Spanish presents markedly attenuated Caribbean Spanish and Canarian Spanish features:

Syllable-final  is aspirated or elided (although the middle class tends to avoid or overcorrect).
Word-final  is realized as velar, and sometimes bilabialized, especially among speakers of African descent.
In this same region the aspirated  and  may result in a glottal stop.
This is called ceceo and is uncommon in the Americas (it is also found in some areas of Andalusia).
There is great variety in the pronunciation of the double LL with some pronouncing it as speakers in Medellin and others pronouncing as a softer Y as pronounced in Caribbean Spanish. 
 Some coastal regions have a sing-songy rhythm and intonation similar to Venezuelan Spanish and Rioplatense Spanish that reflects the late 20th century of Southern Italians settling in Guayaquil and the Guayas Province.

References

Annex: Ecuadorian Spanish
Annex: Colombian Spanish
Annex: Peruvian Spanish

Spanish dialects of South America
Spanish Colombian
Spanish Ecuadorian
Spanish Peruvian